Fantaghirò 5 it is an Italian television miniseries, the fifth belonging to the homonymous romantic fantasy franchise. The miniseries was broadcast for the first time by the italian TV channel Canale 5 in two parts of 100 minutes each, on 23 and 25 December 1996''.

Trama

First Part
Terrifying events begin to happen in a parallel continent. The vegetables and fruits begin to rebel against men, throwing terror among the incredulous population. The kingdom is besieged by strange malignant soldiers made of fruit that kidnap the inhabitants, preferring children, to feed them to a dark captain of a floating vessel.

The surviving rebels find refuge at the underground hiding place of Asteria, a bad but lovable support that offers them not only asylum, but also a possibility of salvation: thanks to the help of a magical talking root, in fact, children who survived the slaughter can recall A hero who helps them. Each child must do nothing but unplug from the root, express a desire and eat it. The boys want a strong, combative, courageous hero, but two of them want that the hero knows how to cook delicious delicacies and that he is a woman.

In the meantime, in the world of Fantaghirò, this is made prisoner of the black witch who, deprived of most of its magical powers, hopes to recover them by killing a person full of goodness like the young queen. But, just as he is about to kill Fantaghirò, the magical root recognizes in her all the requirements expressed by the children and the woman escapes once again to death, finding himself in the other world.

At the beginning the children are not very happy, believing that a female hero is not the one who they wanted, but over time they discover that Fantaghirò is exactly the one who can cope with the mortal danger that fell into their peaceful land. However, Fantaghò would like to return to her world, so Asteria, while the woman is sleeping, she applies to her some "memoryeech", small magical animals that dry up with every feeling related to her home world.

The situation falls rapidly, as complicated by an invincible warrior, apparently made of metal, that Asteria, who's completely in love with him and thinking that she can provide help to rebels, brings back to life by his magical paralysis. The warrior, however, immediately allies with enemy forces, increasingly fierce and ruthless.

Second Part
Fantaghirò, finds herself as an ally of a shameless wandering and clearly in love with her knight, named Aries, who never fails to infuriate her with his out of place irony; Despite his inconstant and childish personality, the knight is a extremely valid help for the small group of rebels, as he demonstrates an incredible ability with weapons, acquired in years of travel for the world. Thanks to Aries's ability, the protagonists manage to defeat the metal warrior, who sink into a river. When Fantaghirò begins to fall in love with Aries, the man decides to test her love and convince Asiateria to giver her back her old feelings.

The movie then reach the final clash between Fantaghirò and Without Name, the captain of the vessel, which will prove to be a sort of automaton built by a magic craftsman with the wood of a bewitched tree, the apalicandro, who is completely indestructible. Without Name reveals to Fantaghirò that since he came to life he began to travel for the worlds feeding on human flesh; The more he ate and the more he became human himself. The final struggle between the captain and Fantaghò is decidedly unequal, as the woman does not have weapons or magical techniques capable of arresting him.

It seems that her end is near, but Fantaghò, makes use of the help of a couple of ravenous magic woodworms, ravenous devourers of apalicandro wood. The captain's body is, in fact, still largely woody, therefore the woodworms, ban on him until they kill him.

Defeated the cannibal monster happiness returns and Fantaghò takes part in the celebrations. The girl, the same one who wanted a woman hero at the beginning of the story, goes to Fantaghirò to deliver the magic root, whose leaves are regrown, to allow her to express the desire to return to her world. However, the girl sees Fantaghirò and Aries exchange passionate effusions, so she thinks that Fantaghirò is happy to stay there with them and throws away the root, leaving Fantaghirò in the dark about her her true life.

Cast

 Alessandra Martines as Fantaghirò
 Remo Girone as Nameless
 Luca Venantini as Aries
 Ludwig Briand as Masala
 Michaela May as Asteria
 Brigitte Nielsen as Black Witch
 Ariadna Caldas as Azela
 Joan Fort as Sarsut
 Casar Luis Gonzales as Gurdalak
 Amarilys Nunez Barrioso as Masala's mom
 Morgane Slemp as Elina

Reception
The last installment of the series is regarded as its lowest point, being "universally hated not only by those who played in it but also by the most avid fans." Its poor reception and low ratings resulted in the cancellation of the planned further sequels.

References

Fantaghirò films
1996 fantasy films
Italian fantasy adventure films
Italian television films
1996 television films
1996 films
Films directed by Lamberto Bava
1990s Italian films